Protolychnis is a genus of moth in the family Lecithoceridae.

Species
 Protolychnis bastini Park, 2020
Protolychnis chlorotoma (Meyrick, 1914)
Protolychnis ipnosa Wu, 1994
 Protolychnis maculata (Walsingham, 1881)
 Protolychnis marginata (Walsingham, 1891)
Protolychnis morogorensi Park & Koo, 2021
Protolychnis natalensis Park & De Prins, 2019
Protolychnis oculiella Park & Koo, 2021
Protolychnis petiliella Park, 2020
 Protolychnis trigonias (Meyrick, 1904)

References

Natural History Museum Lepidoptera genus database
A new genus Viperinus Park with descriptions of two new species, and two new species of the genus Protolychnis Meyrick, 1925 (Lepidoptera, Gelechioidea, Lecithoceridae) in Kenya and Tanzania, with a checklist of the world species

 
Lecithocerinae
Moth genera